Mangion is a Maltese surname. Notable people with the surname include:

Charles Mangion (born 1952), Maltese politician
Robert Mangion, Maltese judge
Silvio Mangion (born 1965), Maltese serial killer
William Mangion (born 1958), Maltese singer

Maltese-language surnames